Zsolt Wintermantel (born 26 February 1972) is a Hungarian politician, who served as Mayor of Újpest (4th district of Budapest) from 2010 to 2019. Besides that he represented Újpest (Budapest Constituency VI) in the National Assembly of Hungary from 2010 to 2014. He was also Member of Parliament from the Budapest Regional List of Fidesz between 2004 and 2006, when he replaced Béla Glattfelder.

Wintermantel has been the leader of the Fidesz caucus in the General Assembly of Budapest since May 2022, succeeding Zsolt Láng.

References

1972 births
Living people
Engineers from Budapest
Fidesz politicians
Members of the National Assembly of Hungary (2002–2006)
Members of the National Assembly of Hungary (2010–2014)
Mayors of places in Hungary
Politicians from Budapest